Eastern Upper Lusatia is a natural region in Saxony and, in a broader sense, part of the Western Sudetes range including the Lower Silesian Voivodeship. The current Saxon division of natural regions view the region as part of the Saxon Loess Fields and divides it into 12 subdivisions at the level of meso-geochores.

Location and boundaries 
Eastern Upper Lusatia runs in a north-south direction between the towns of Görlitz and Zittau. In the north it borders on the Upper Lusatian Heath and Pond Landscape (Oberlausitzer Heide- und Teichgebiet), in the south on the Zittau Mountains, in the west on the Upper Lusatian Gefilde (Oberlausitzer Gefilde) and the Upper Lusatian Highlands. Its eastern part is bisected by the Lusatian Neisse and lies in Poland. Geographical features of particular note in the region are the Königshain Hills, the Neiße valley and the old mining landscapes south of Görlitz and in the Zittau Basin.

Natural region divisions 
The Eastern Upper Lusatia is divided as follows into mesogeochores and microgeochores and hills:
 12 Eastern Upper Lusatia
 11002 Zittau Basin (65.04 km²)
 Hirschfeld Neiße Valley
 Olbersdorf Ridge
 Northern Zittau Basin
 Southern Zittau Basin
 Zittau Neiße and Mandau Valley
 Olbersdorf Open-Cast Mine (Olbersdorfer See)
 11003 Großschönau Basin and Kuppenland (60.97 km² in SN; continues into Czechia)
 Spitzkunnersdorf Kuppen Region (in CZ: Varnsdorfský Špičák 544.3 m; Hofebusch and Richterberg (469.3 m), Lindeberg 459.3 m Forstenberg 454.8 m, Pfaffenberg 418.1 m, Wiedeberg 396.6 m)
 Seifhennersdorf Kuppen Region (border region of the otherwise entirely Czech southeastern part of the Lusatian Highlands; Frenzelsberg 468.2 m)
 Oberoderwitz Kuppen Region (Oberoderwitzer Spitzberg 510.0 m, Großer Stein 471 m, Hofeberg 413.6 m)
 Großschönau Basin (z. T. in Tschechien); Finkenhübel 410;6 m, Hutberg (371.5 m)
 Bertsdorf Kuppen Region (Steinberg 442.5 m, Seidelsberg 433.4 m)
 Hainewald Kuppen Region (Pocheberg 465.8 m, Scheibeberg 422.7 m)
 Breiteberg Kuppe (510.1 m)
 Bertsdorf Basin
 11004 Großhennersdorf Loess  Hills (100.83 km²)
 Loess Plateau of Klosterwald
 Großhennersdorf Loess Plateau
 Sonnenhübel Kuppe (469.3 m)
 Niederoderwitz Kuppen Region (Pferdeberg 405.5 m, Hutberg 404.5 m)
 Neundorfer Loess Plateau
 Loess Plateau of Sonnenhübel
 Oberoderwitz Loess Plateau
 Wittgendorf Loess Hills (Buchberg 401.1 m, Steinberg 353.1 m, Schlegelberg 352.6 m)
 Dittersbach Loess Hills (Knorrberg 380,5 m)
 Oderwitzer Loess Plateau
 Großhennersdorf Kuppen Region (Großer Berg 439.2 m, Schönbrunner Berg 428.7 m, Schanzberg 408.0 m, Langer Berg 371.8 m, Eisberg 330,6 m)
 11005 Loess Ridge bei Hirschfelde (19.51 km²)
 Ridge of the Klosterwald (Mitterer Steinberg 345.9 m)
 Dittelsdorf Loess Riedel
 Neiße Valley near St. Marienthal
 11006 Neugersdorf Loess Ridge (50,14 km² in SN; partly in Czechia)
 Seifhennersdorf Ridge (partly in Czechia)
 Neugersdorfer FlachRidgegebiet (partly in Czechia)
 Eibau-Leutersdorfer Ridgegebiet (partly in Czechia); Lerchenberg 466.7 m, Wacheberg (452 m)
 11007 Ruppersdorfer Loess Plateaux (34.78 km²)
 Obercunnersdorfer Loess Plateau
 Ruppersdorfer DeckLoess Plateau (Fuchsberg 362.0 m)
 Euldorfer Loess Plateau
 11008 Herrnhuter Loess Hills (60,62 km²)
 Löbauer Berg-Schafberg Ridge (447.9 m und 450,5 m)
 Herrnhut Hills (Hutberg 371.9 m, Heinrichberg 357.1 m, Eichler 333.5 m, Roter Berg 331.1 m)
 Strahwalder Bergkuppen (Wolfsberg 445.1 m; Jäckelberg 395.3 m, Sonneberg 392.6 m)
 Berthelsdorf Valley Riedel
 Kemnitz Loess Hills
 11009 Loess plateaux on the Eigen (43.67 km²)
 Loess Plateau of Großer Nonnenwald
 Altbernsdorf Loess Plateau
 Loess Plateau of Kleiner Nonnenwald
 Kiesdorf Loess Plateau (Großer Hutberg 308.0 m, Kleiner Hutberg 298.0 m)
 11010 Neiße Valley near Görlitz (33.20 km²)
 Görlitz Neiße Valley
 Berzdorf Open-Cast Mine (Berzdorfer See)
 Ostritz Neiße Valley
 11011 Görlitz Loess Plateaux (105.44 km²)
 Girbigsdorf Loess Plateau
 Pfaffendorf Loess Plateau
 Kunnewitz Incline
 Holtendorf Loess Plateau
 Landeskrone-Biesnitz Kuppen Region (up to 420.0 m)
 Town of Görlitz
 Kunnersdorf Kuppen Region
 Gersdorf Loess Plateau
 Emmerichswald Plateau
 11012 Reichenbach Loess Hills (79.14 km²)
 Rotstein Ridge (Rotstein 453.7 m, Hengstberg 421.3 m, Georgenberg 396.5 m, Horkenberg 331.9 m; on the far side of the railway and B 6: Rosenhainer Berg 307.9 m)
 Sohlander Loess Hills (Paulsdorfer Spitzberg 370,9 m, Heideberg 341.3 m, Steinberg 322.0 m, Silberberg 313.7 m)
 Kleinradmeritz Loess Plateau (Petzschkenberg: 227.5 m, ridge west of Glossen: a good 220 m)
 Reichenbach Loess Hills
 Meuselwitz Loess Hills
 Mengelsdorf Loess Hills
 Friedersdorf Hills (Friedersdorfer Berg 398.7 m, Schwarzer Berg 390,5 m, Kreuzberg 365.6 m)
 11013 Königshain Hills (66.49 km²)
 Hills of Liebstein (Liebsteiner Berg: 294.6 m)
 Niesky-Rengersdorf Slate Hills (Heideberg: 249.9 m)
 Eichberg-Hutberg Ridge (up to 345.6 m; western Königshain Hills)
 Arnsdorf Loess Hills, Königshainer Loess Hills
 Hochstein-Kämpferberg Ridge (397.2 m und 415 m; Königshain Hills)
Notes

Landscape and geology 
The natural region is very varied and characterized by hill ranges, isolated hills, plateau and basins alongside one another. Ice age ground moraines, meltwater sands and the overlying loess soils fill out the granite relief to varying degrees. The loess loam is generally only about 1 to 1.5 m thick. As witnesses to the Tertiary volcanism of the area there are lava plains and isolated hills of basalt and phonolite. In the Zittau and Oderwitz Basin, as well as the Berzdorf Basin there are important deposits of brown coal in the sediments.

Climatically Eastern Upper Lusatia lies partially in the lee of the Upper Lusatian Highlands. For example, onlyr 665 mm of precipitation falls annually. The average annual temperature lies between 8 and 8.6 °C. The potential natural vegetation here is Wood Bedstraw-Hornbeam-Oak forest with Small-leaved Limes.

References

Bibliography 
 Mannsfeld, K. und Syrbe, R.-U. (eds.): Naturräume in Sachsen mit Kartenbeilage "Naturräumliche Gliederung Sachsens", in: Forschungen zur deutschen Landeskunde (Vol. 257), Deutsche Akademie für Landeskunde, Selbstverlag, Leipzig, 2008,

External links 
 Large scale division, subdivisions and overview map as part of the Upper Lusatia-Lower Silesia planning region, retrieved 11 March 2012

Natural regions of Saxony
Upper Lusatia
Sudetes